HMS Unswerving (P63) was a Royal Navy U-class submarine built by Vickers-Armstrong.  So far she has been the only ship of the Royal Navy to bear the name Unswerving.

Career
Unswerving carried out work-ups at end of 1943, then joined the 1st Flotilla in the Mediterranean, where she carried out patrols in the Aegean Sea.  She would eventually spend most of her wartime career in the Mediterranean, where she sank the German guardboats GN 61 and GN 62, the German tanker Bertha (the former French Bacchus) and six sailing vessels, and claimed to have damaged a seventh.  She was however unlucky on numerous occasions, unsuccessfully attacking the small German merchant Toni (the former Greek Thalia), the German auxiliary minelayer Zeus, the German transport Pelikan and her escort, the German torpedo boat TA19, and the German merchant Gertrud on two separate occasions.

Under the command of Lieutenant M. D. "Mick" Tattershall, Unswerving was the first British submarine where all the officers were members of the Royal Naval Volunteer Reserve rather than any of them being officers of the regular navy.

Unswerving survived the war and arrived at John Cashmore Ltd, Newport on 10 July 1949 for scrapping.

References
 
 
 
 
 

 

British U-class submarines
Ships built on the River Tyne
1943 ships
World War II submarines of the United Kingdom
Ships built by Vickers Armstrong